Now's the Time is the debut album by 4 P.M., released in 1995.

Track listing
"Sukiyaki" - 2:42
"Lay Down Your Love" - 4:27
"Forever in My Heart" - 4:35
"Gift of Perfect Love" - 4:02
"Yes" - 3:53
"In This Life" - 3:06
"Naturally" - 5:05
"For What More" - 4:12
"Father and Child" - 3:59
"Time (Clock of the Heart)" - 4:27
"Then Came You" - 3:32
"So Glad You Said the Words" - 3:55
"Years from Here" - 4:19 (bonus track)
"Lay Down Your Love" (4 A.M. Lover's Groove) - 4:17 (bonus track)

Charts

References

1995 debut albums